Emma Ritoók or Ritoók Emma (15 July 1868 – 3 April 1945) was a poet, critic and philosopher.

Biography 
Emman Ritoók was born in Nagyvárad in what was then Austria-Hungary, and is now Oradea in Romania. Ritoók studied in Budapest, Leipzig and Paris and in 1906 she obtained a doctorate in philology.  She was a librarian at the Capital Library.  In 1897 she won a science competition prize ( A természettudományi irány a szépirodalomban  The natural science trend in fiction) of the Szigligeti Társaság of Nagyvárad.  In 1905 she distinguished herself with her winning novel  Egyenes úton - egyedül .  She translated from Scandinavian writers Bjørnstjerne Bjørnson, Knut Hamsun.
She was a member of the Budapest philosophical discussion group "Sunday Circle".

She died in Budapest, Hungary in 1945.

Works 
  Egyenes úton - egyedül  (romano, Bp., 1905);
  Arany János elmélete az eposzról  (study, Bp., 1906);
  A nagy véletlen  (romano, Bp., 1909);
  Négyen a tűz körül  (stories, Bp., 1911);
  Ellenséges világ  (stories, Bp., 1911);
  Sőtét hónapok  (poems, Bp., 1920);
  A szellem kalandorai  (I - II., Romano, Bp., 1921);
  Pán megváltása  (Mistery Game, Bp., 1929);
  Gyárfás Sándor két élete  (Roman, Bp., 1933).

References

1868 births
1945 deaths
People from Oradea
Hungarian women poets
20th-century Hungarian poets
20th-century Hungarian women writers